Popple River is a tributary of the Pine River in the northeastern portion of the U.S. state of Wisconsin.

Popple River rises in the town of Argonne in northern Forest County and flows east through the Nicolet National Forest, running through the community of Popple River. The river continues through southern Florence County, eventually leaving the forest and heading north to its mouth at the Pine River.

See also
List of rivers of Wisconsin

References

Rivers of Wisconsin
Bodies of water of Florence County, Wisconsin
Rivers of Forest County, Wisconsin